André Luíz Baracho (born July 15, 1980), known as just André, is a former Brazilian football player.

Club statistics

References

External links

1980 births
Living people
Brazilian footballers
Brazilian expatriate footballers
J2 League players
Oita Trinita players
Sagan Tosu players
Expatriate footballers in Japan
Association football forwards